Hanscom Park is a historic neighborhood in Midtown Omaha, Nebraska. Its namesake public park is one of the oldest parks in Omaha, donated to the City in 1872. U.S. President Gerald R. Ford was born in a house in the Hanscom Park neighborhood. Its boundaries are Woolworth Street on the north, South 32nd on the west, Interstate 480 on the east and I-80 on the south.

History
Hanscom Park is one of the oldest residential subdivisions in Omaha. Andrew J. Hanscom and James Megeath donated the  park in October 1872. Hanscom bought the land from Colonel Sam Bayliss, one of the original homesteaders in Omaha City in 1854. When the community was developed through the 1890s, it was on the western fringe of Omaha. The site was ideal for an upscale development because of its access to a new electric trolley line connecting it with downtown.

The neighborhood is home to several notable houses. One of them, the George N. Hicks House, has been designated an Omaha Landmark. In 1913, U.S. President Gerald Ford was born in his grandfather's mansion at 3202 Woolworth Avenue in the Hanscom Park neighborhood. Today the Gerald R. Ford Birthsite and Gardens celebrates this location.

Hanscom Park
Hanscom Park, located at 1899 South 32nd Avenue, was developed by the City of Omaha in 1889 as one of the first by the newly formed Park Commission. After paying a landscape architect $913.30 for plans to improve the rough tract of land, the Commission reported the park was, "radically changed in plan and very greatly improved... Two lakes, a cascade, extensive flower beds, two and one-half miles of macadamized roadway, fountains and a magnificent growth of forest trees makes this the only finished park in the city."  Design elements from that time have survived.  The Brandeis Indoor Tennis Courts facility is also located within the park property. The park is bordered on the East by Park Ave and the West border is 32nd Ave.  The North border for the park is Woolworth Ave and the South border is Ed Creighton Ave.

Present
After years of historical houses in the neighborhood being converted into apartments, there has been a noticeable increase in the number of properties that have been returned to single family homes during the past few years.

See also

 Neighborhoods of Omaha, Nebraska
 Hanscom Park United Methodist Church

References

External links
Hanscom Park Neighborhood Association
Historic photos and postcards - Nebraska Memories

Historic districts in Omaha, Nebraska
Neighborhoods in Omaha, Nebraska
Parks in Omaha, Nebraska
Landmarks in South Omaha, Nebraska
Midtown Omaha, Nebraska
Populated places established in 1899